Scrobipalpa sinica is a moth in the family Gelechiidae. It was described by Oleksiy V. Bidzilya and Hou-Hun Li in 2010. It is found in China (Inner Mongolia) and Mongolia.

The forewings are covered with light-grey brown-tipped scales. The veins are slightly mottled yellow, especially in the basal part of the forewing and there is an indistinct small black spot at the base and at the corner of the cell. The hindwings are light grey. Adults are on wing in August.

Etymology
The species name refers to the distribution of the species.

References

Scrobipalpa
Moths described in 2010